Vaman is a given name. Notable people with the name include:

Vaman Shivram Apte (1858–1892), Indian lexicographer and a professor of Sanskrit at Pune's Fergusson College
Vishnu Vaman Bapat (born 1871), Indian philosopher, famous for his commentary in Marathi on ancient Sanskrit texts
Keshav Vaman Bhole (1896–1967), also known as Keshavrao Bhole, well-known music composer and critic in Indian cinema
Vaman Krushna Chorghade (1914–1995), Marathi writer from Maharashtra, India
Shankar Vaman Dandekar (1896–1969), philosopher and educationist from Maharashtra, India
Harihar Vaman Deshpande (1905–1965), born at Chendkapur (Amravati) Maharashtra, India
Raghunath Vaman Dighe (1896–1980), Marathi writer from Maharashtra, India
Vaman Gopal Joshi (1881–1956), Marathi journalist, playwright, and freedom fighter, from Maharashtra, India
Vaman Malhar Joshi (1882–1943), Marathi writer from Maharashtra, India
Kundapur Vaman Kamath, chief of the New Development Bank of BRICS countries
Pandurang Vaman Kane (1880–1972), notable Indologist and Sanskrit scholar
Vaman Tabaji Kardak (1927–2003), Marathi Ambedkarist poet, reformer
Bhalchandra Vaman Kelkar (1920–1987), Marathi writer and actor, from Maharashtra, India
Vaman Srinivas Kudva, founder director of Syndicate Bank
Vaman Kumar (born 1935), former Indian cricketer
Vaman Pandit (1608–1695), Marathi scholar and poet of India
Laxman Vaman Paranjpe, co-founder of the Hindu nationalist organisation Rashtriya Swayamsevak Sangh (RSS)
Datto Vaman Potdar (1890–1979), Indian historian, writer, and orator
Basti Vaman Shenoy (born 1934), Konkani activist, founder of World Konkani Centre in Shakthinagar, Mangalore
Vishnu Vaman Shirvadakar (1912–1999), (Kusumāgraj), Marathi poet, playwright, novelist, short story writer

See also
Vaman River, tributary of the Bistricioara River in Romania
VMAN
Vaamanan
Vahman
Vamana
Vamban